Kim Jong-dal (born 28 May 1946) is a South Korean judoka. He competed in the men's heavyweight event at the 1964 Summer Olympics.

References

1946 births
Living people
South Korean male judoka
Olympic judoka of South Korea
Judoka at the 1964 Summer Olympics
Place of birth missing (living people)